Pseudochazara mniszechii, the tawny rockbrown, is a species of butterfly in the family Nymphalidae. It is confined to Greece, Turkey, northern Iran, Balochistan, and the Caucasus.

Flight period 
The species is univoltine and is on wing from the end of June to mid-September.

Food plants
Larvae feed on grasses.

Subspecies
Pseudochazara mniszechii mniszechii Turkey
Pseudochazara mniszechii caucasica (Lederer, 1864) Erzincan, Erzurum, Gumushane, Kars, Tunceli and Bayburt, Ardahan - Turkey (also seen in Transcaucasia)
Pseudochazara mniszechii tisiphone (Brown, 1981) Northern Greece, Bursa - Turkey

Description in Seitz
S. mniszechii H.-Schiff. (43 e). Very similar to the preceding [ S. telephassa ], especially in the female sex but with the reddish yellow band of the forewing with the proximal edge less straight, neither being interrupted below the apical ocellus as in the pelopea- forms , nor strongly constricted as in telephassa. The band of the hindwing more even than in telephassa, almost reaching the costal edge. At the anal angle of the hindwing above there are always 2 distinct small white spots. Underside more uniformly sandy grey or sandy brown in
both sexes. Size exactly as in telephassa. East-coast of the Black Sea, and Asia Minor. — In herrichii [now subspecies ] Stgr., from North Persia and Turkestan, the fringes are white, the bands of the upperside broader and brighter red -yellow; the hindwing beneath grey, the markings being more distinct in the male.

Gallery

References

 Satyrinae of the Western Palearctic - Pseudochazara mniszechii

Pseudochazara
Butterflies described in 1851